Zapp may refer to:

People
Jim Zapp (1924-2016), baseball player
Robert-Richard Zapp, a German U-boat commander during World War II
Walter Zapp, a Baltic German inventor, designer of miniature cameras
Zapp Brannigan, a fictional character from the television series Futurama

Places

Willow Springs, Fayette County, Texas, a town previously known as Zapp

Business

Zapp (TV channel), a Dutch children's TV channel
Zapp Mobile, a Romanian mobile telephony operator
Zapp (mobile payments), a UK mobile phone payment system

Music

Zapp (band), a 1980s funk band based in Ohio, USA
Zapp (album), the debut album by the funk band
Zapp, an Anglicisation of żaqq, a Maltese musical instrument

Other

 Zapp flaps, a mechanism used to reduce aircraft speed (actually Zap as they were developed by a Mr. Zaparka but often misspelled)
 ZZZap!, British children's television comedy programme

See also
Zap (disambiguation)